Gargar-e Sofla or Gerger-e Sofla may refer to:
 Gargar-e Sofla, Khuzestan
 Gerger-e Sofla, Kurdistan

See also
 Gerger, Iran (disambiguation)